The 1972 IHF Olympic African qualification tournament was held in the Tunisia. The winner of the tournament qualified for the 1972 Summer Olympics.

Standings

Matches
''All times are local (UTC+1).

Some results were published in a Swiss newspapers. The winner of the other games were derived from the two standings table. And the results of the Algerian team.

Roaster of Algeria 
Hachemi, Zoheir Negli, Amara, Farouk Bouzrar, Boukhobza, Lamdjadani, Bouras, Larbaoui

Coaches: Mircea Costache II et Djoudi

References

Qualification tournament - AfriEGY
Olympics tournaments
November 1971 sports events in Africa
IHF